Namibia is a country in southern Africa whose western border is the Atlantic Ocean. It shares land borders with Zambia and Angola to the north, Botswana to the east and South Africa to the south and east. Although it does not border Zimbabwe, a part of less than 200 metres of the Zambezi River (essentially a small bulge in Botswana to achieve a Botswana/Zambia micro-border) separates the two countries. Namibia gained independence from South Africa on 21 March 1990, following the Namibian War of Independence. Its capital and largest city is Windhoek, and it is a member state of the United Nations (UN), the Southern African Development Community (SADC), the African Union (AU), and the Commonwealth of Nations.

Agriculture, herding, tourism and the mining industry – including mining for gem diamonds, uranium, gold, silver, and base metals – form the basis of its economy.

For further information on the types of business entities in this country and their abbreviations, see "Business entities in Namibia".

Notable firms 
This list includes notable companies with primary headquarters located in the country. The industry and sector follow the Industry Classification Benchmark taxonomy. Organizations which have ceased operations are included and noted as defunct.

See also 
 List of airlines of Namibia
 List of banks in Namibia
 List of state-owned enterprises in Namibia

References 

 
 
Namibia